The Port-Daniel station is an inactive railway station built in 1908 by Quebec Atlantic Oriental Railway. The railway line and service was acquired by CN Rail. CN retained the tracks until 1998, but VIA Rail took over passenger service from 1977 to 2013.

The station is located on Route 132 in Port-Daniel–Gascons, Quebec, Canada. It was formerly staffed by VIA Rail but it has closed permanently; Via lists the station as a "sign post". , the Gaspé train is not running; the closest passenger rail service is provided at the Matapédia railway station. It is unknown if or when service to Gaspé will resume. The station was given protected status in 1995.

References

External links

Via Rail stations in Quebec
Railway stations in Canada opened in 1908
Railway stations in Gaspésie–Îles-de-la-Madeleine
1908 establishments in Quebec
Disused railway stations in Canada